The Kentucky Wildcats men's soccer team is an intercollegiate varsity sports team of the University of Kentucky (UK).

Since the Southeastern Conference (SEC) does not sponsor men's soccer (minimum four schools needed to sponsor a sport, only two offer it), the team has been associate members of other conferences. From 1995 to 2004, it was a member of the Mid-American Conference. In 2005, UK moved men's soccer to Conference USA, creating a rivalry with fellow new member South Carolina, which had rejoined the reunified conference that season. Both UK and South Carolina remained in C-USA men's soccer through the 2021 season, after which both programs left for the newly reinstated men's soccer league of the Sun Belt Conference.

In 2018, Kentucky went 17–1–1 with wins against #6 Louisville and #2 Indiana, both by a score of 3–0 at home. They finished 7–1 overall in conference play with their only lose coming on the road at FIU 2–3. The Wildcats won the C-USA Regular Season and Tournament Titles. They were the #3 overall seed in the NCAA Tournament, their highest until 2022.

In 2022, Kentucky finished the regular season at 14-0-5 with wins against #10 Louisville and #21 Lipscomb at home, both by scores of 3-2. They also tied against #20 Tulsa in Tulsa 1-1 and #7 Marshall in Lexington 1-1. All four of these games in a two week span from September 6th to September 20th. They finished 5-0-3 and Sun Belt Regular Season and Tournament Champions. They were awarded the #1 overall seed in the NCAA Tournament, the first time in school history. 

The school has two major rivalries, one traditional and one unique since they are an all-sports in-conference competition, but in this sport is a rivalry because of its nature.

 Governor's Cup:  Against in-state rival Louisville, the traditional all-sports rivalry between Louisville (ACC) and Kentucky (SBC).
 SEC Derby:  While UK and South Carolina are not regarded as major SEC rivals in other sports, the two schools are the only SEC members that sponsor varsity men's soccer teams. UK left the Mid-American Conference after the 2004 season when South Carolina rejoined the reunified Conference USA, in which it had last been a member in 1994 (when it was the Metro). The two schools moved men's soccer together to the Sun Belt Conference for 2022. Both schools have referred to the rivalry as the Southeastern Conference Men's Championship.

Notable former players
 
 Andy Gruenebaum
 Riley O'Neill
 Michael D'Agostino
 Barry Rice
 Jason Griffiths
 Callum Irving
 Napo Matsoso
 JJ Williams
 Aimé Mabika
 Brett Smith

References

External links 
 

 
1991 establishments in Kentucky